Tinana State School is a public primary school located in the suburb of Tinana in Maryborough, Queensland, Australia. The school is run by the Queensland State Government and was one of the first public schools to be established in Queensland. The school colours are red and black.

History

Tinana State School was opened on 31 May 1875 with an enrolment of 47 students. The school grounds were large for their time as schools were commonly allotted  of land.

On 25 April (Anzac Day) 2015, as part of the World War I centenary, a war memorial was officially unveiled at the school. It commemorates former students who served in World War I.

Location

The school is located on Gympie Rd in Tinana, Maryborough, Queensland.

Facilities
The school has a number of sporting facilities including a multipurpose court, cricket pitch, cricket nets, sport equipment borrowing sheds and a very large and spacious oval, including the Neil Ottaway Oval which is levelled and irrigated. The school has a computer lab with network and internet access. A school library with a range of books and resources is available to the students. Tinana State School has a rainforest, with new trees added regularly.

Sport
There are two major sporting events between different sports houses during the year. Cross Country and Athletics Carnival.
The school is divided into three houses:

Chappell (Green)
Laver (Yellow)
Whickham (Blue)

Students are randomly assigned a position in houses, unless a sibling currently attends the school they are assigned a position in the same house.

References

External links

www.tinanass.eq.edu.au

Public primary schools in Queensland
Schools in Wide Bay–Burnett
Maryborough, Queensland
Educational institutions established in 1875
Tinana, Queensland
1875 establishments in Australia